Aquila is both a given name and a surname. Notable people with the name include:

Ancient and biblical
Priscilla and Aquila, a New Testament couple who assisted Paul of Tarsus
Aquila of Sinope, second-century translator of the Old Testament
Aquila Romanus, a third-century Latin grammarian
Pontius Aquila, first-century B.C. Roman tribune of the plebs

Medieval and renaissance
Caspar Aquila (1488-1560), German reformer
Nicholas de Aquila (died after 1220), English bishop
Peter of Aquila (died 1361), Italian theologian
Pietro Aquila (c. 1630-1692), Italian painter
Richard II of Aquila, 12th-century Italo-Norman Count of Fondi
Serafino dell' Aquila (1466-1500), Italian poet

Modern
Aquila Chase (17th century), early Puritan settler in the American colonies and founder of the influential Chase family
Aquila Emil (died 2011), Papua New Guinean rugby league footballer
Aquila Berlas Kiani (1921 - 2012), Pakistani scholar
Frank Aquila, a Manitoba judge
Frank J. Aquila (born 1957), American lawyer
Samuel J. Aquila (born 1950), Roman Catholic bishop

Italian-language surnames
Latin-language surnames
Unisex given names
Surnames from nicknames